George Herbert Loepp (September 11, 1901 – September 4, 1967) was an outfielder in Major League Baseball, playing mainly as a center fielder from 1928 to 1930 for the Boston Red Sox (1928) and Washington Senators (1930). He was born in Detroit, Michigan.

In a two-season career, Loepp was a .249 hitter (46-for-185) with 29 runs and 17 RBI in 65 games, including 10 doubles, two triples, and a .347 on-base percentage. He did not hit any home runs. As an outfielder, he committed six errors in 135 chances for a collective .956 fielding percentage.

Loepp died in Los Angeles at age 65.

External links

Boston Red Sox players
Washington Senators (1901–1960) players
Selma Selmians players
Major League Baseball outfielders
Baseball players from Michigan
1901 births
1967 deaths